Scanno may refer to:

 Scanno, Abruzzo, a comune in Italy
 Lago di Scanno, a lake in Abruzzo
 the equivalent of a typo, resulting from imperfect optical character recognition of a document digitized with a scanner